Lesbian, gay, bisexual, and transgender (LGBT) people in Guyana face legal challenges not experienced by non-LGBT residents. Guyana is the only country in South America, and the only country in the Americas outside the Caribbean, where homosexual acts including anal sex and oral sex are still illegal. Recently, there have been efforts to decriminalize homosexual behaviours.

In August 2016, the Belize Supreme Court struck down Belize's sodomy ban as unconstitutional. Because Belize and Guyana (and all member states of CARICOM) share an identical jurisprudence, Guyana's ban is also unconstitutional. However, unlike Belize, Guyana's Constitution contains a "savings clause", which protects laws inherited by the former British Empire from constitutional review, even if these laws run counter to fundamental human rights. Cross-dressing was illegal until November 2018, when the statute was struck down by the Caribbean Court of Justice, the court of last resort of Guyana.

Guyanese society tends to view homosexuality, transgender and non-binary people negatively, though attitudes are slowly changing and becoming more accepting. The country's first pride parade took place in June 2018 with the support of various political and religious leaders, making it the first such event in the English-speaking Caribbean, and has inspired other countries to hold their own pride parades such as Barbados, Trinidad and Tobago and Saint Lucia. The country's second pride parade took place in June 2019.

Laws about same-sex sexual activity

According to the Criminal Law (Offences) Act of Guyana:

Section 351. Any male person who, in public or private, commits, or is a party to the commission, or procures or attempts to procure the commission, by any male person, of any act of gross indecency with any other male person shall be guilty of a misdemeanour and liable to imprisonment for two years.
Section 352. Everyone who-
(a) attempts to commit buggery; or
(b) assaults any person with intent to commit buggery; or
(c) being a male, indecently assaults any other male person,
shall be guilty of felony and liable to imprisonment for ten years.
Section 353. Everyone who commits buggery ... shall be guilty of felony and liable to imprisonment for life.
Section 354. Everyone who-
(a) does any indecent act in any place to which the public have or are permitted to have access; or
(b) does any indecent act in any place, intending thereby to insult or offend any person,
shall be guilty of a misdemeanour and liable to imprisonment for two years.

The law does not specifically define "buggery", "gross indecency" or "indecent", as these terms remain defined by the common law, specifically the colonial era English common law, which Guyana inherited most of its laws from.

Decriminalisation efforts
Following a call from Dr. Edward Greene, the United Nations Special Envoy on HIV/AIDS to the Caribbean, to decriminalise homosexuality, the Guyanese Government announced in April 2012 that it was launching a national debate on whether to overhaul the country's laws that discriminate against LGBT people. Religious groups voiced their opposition to any changes in those laws.

In 2013, the Government created a parliamentary commission to decide whether to scrap the country's buggery laws. It started receiving public submissions in early 2014.

During the 2015 elections, both major political parties expressed support for LGBT rights. The People's Progressive Party stated that: "We believe that all Guyanese must be free to make choices and must not be discriminated against because of their ethnicity, gender, religion or sexual orientation." The electoral manifesto of APNU-Alliance for Change, the largest party in Parliament, calls for an end to discrimination against LGBT people.

In April 2017, the Government announced it would hold a referendum to decide whether to decriminalise homosexuality. However, in May 2017, Pink News reported that no referendum would be held, as several Guyanese media organisations had misunderstood the Government's position.

President David A. Granger supports legalising same-sex sexual acts. In 2016, he said: "I am prepared to respect the rights of any adult to indulge in any practice which is not harmful to others."

In August 2016 and April 2018, the Belize Supreme Court and the Trinidad and Tobago High Court, respectively, ruled that laws criminalising homosexuality are unconstitutional. These rulings have been welcomed by Guyanese LGBT activists, who hope to have their own laws repealed too.

In May 2019, the Society Against Sexual Orientation Discrimination stated that it hopes the Legal Affairs Ministry's Law Reform Commission, after meeting with stakeholders, will be able to update the "archaic" laws in keeping with international practices. This will see the removal of discriminatory clauses.

Recognition of same-sex relationships
Same-sex marriage and civil unions are not legal in Guyana.

Adoption and parenting
According to the U.S. Department of State, an LGBT person is not disqualified from adopting a child in Guyana. Both married and single people may adopt.

In December 2015, the Director of Guyana's Childcare and Protection Agency (CPA) stated that the CPA does not discriminate as there are no laws barring LGBT individuals and same-sex couples from adopting, being foster parents or guardians. The statement also encourages LGBT individuals to become adoptive parents and reiterates the lack of legal barriers as the Director of the CPA can issue a mandate determining which potential applicants can adopt under the Childcare and Protection Act.

Discrimination protections
In December 2000, the National Assembly of Guyana unanimously approved a proposed amendment to the Constitution that would have prohibited discrimination based on sexual orientation. But the efforts of religious leaders prior to the March 2001 elections caused President Bharrat Jagdeo to deny his assent to the amendment. A new amendment, containing only the sexual orientation clause, was put before the Assembly in 2003, although it made no progress and was later withdrawn by the Government.

In 2016, Minister of Social Protection Amna Ally pledged to be a "driving force" to end discrimination against LGBT people. In July 2019, Ally revealed during a presentation of Guyana's statement on the ninth periodic report on the implementation of the Convention on the Elimination of All Forms of Discrimination Against Women (CEDAW) in Geneva, Switzerland that the Guyanese Government is working to ensure all legal gaps are removed to prevent discrimination based on sexual orientation and gender identity. She said, "The government believes that every individual regardless of sexual orientation, gender identity has an inherent human right to live their life free from violence, abuse and discrimination."

Gender identity and expression
Under Guyanese law, cross-dressing was illegal until 2018. In 2009, several transgender activists were arrested for wearing clothes of the opposite sex. In 2010, Guyana Trans United launched a Supreme Court challenge against the cross-dressing law. In 2013, Chief Justice Ian Chang ruled that cross-dressing was legal unless done for an "improper purpose". Guyana Trans United appealed the case to Guyana's Court of Appeal, denouncing the law as discriminatory and unconstitutional. However, the Court of Appeal subsequently upheld Chang's ruling. The case was then appealed to the Caribbean Court of Justice (CCJ). At issue was the vagueness of "improper purpose" and whether the law can be challenged because of the savings clause exemption. The savings clause prevents colonial-era laws from being challenged. The oral arguments in the case began on 28 June 2018, and the court reserved the ruling for a later date. On 13 November 2018, the Caribbean Court of Justice ruled in the case Quincy McEwan, Seon Clarke, Joseph Fraser, Seyon Persaud and the Society Against Sexual Orientation Discrimination (SASOD) v The Attorney General of Guyana that Section 153(1)(XLVII) of the Summary Jurisdiction (Offences) Act is unconstitutional and must be struck down from the legal code. The panel of five judges ruled that the statute, in addition to being archaic and vague, "violated the appellants' right to protection of the law and was contrary to the rule of law".

In 2017, a transgender woman was assaulted and attacked in the capital city of Georgetown. She reported the attack to the police and filed a case against her attacker before the Georgetown Magistrates Court. On 2 March 2017, the day the verdict was announced, she was denied entry into the courtroom because she was not "dressed like a man". The court later dismissed her case.

Living conditions
Discrimination and violence against LGBT people is widespread in Guyana due to the heavy influence of Christianity and Biblical law, in both social and political norms. British law criminalized same-sex activity which stood well after Guyana's independence, and created a homophobic society. The majority of Guyana's population frown upon homosexuality. LGBT persons continuously face violence and verbal harassment in Guyana, at the hands of law enforcement, religious leaders and others, and because of this, most keep their sexual orientation hidden. A common term for gay men in Guyana is "anti-men".

About 60% of the population are Christians, while the remaining are mostly Hindu and Muslim. Pentecostal and Muslim groups have strongly opposed improving the lives of LGBT people, from opposing discrimination protections to opposing freedom of speech for LGBT people. Shortly before the first pride parade on 2 June 2018, the Georgetown Ministers' Fellowship called on the Government to ban the event, stating that LGBT people should have no right to freedom of assembly and freedom of speech. The group called the event "immoral". The Government ignored their request. Furthermore, the Anglican Bishop of Guyana and Suriname expressed support for the march, saying: "I disagree with the call to ban and must point out that the LGBT community has the right like all of us to march on the streets of Georgetown with police permission. We are all God's children and our rights must be protected. I am the Bishop of Guyana and I approve this message."

Guyana's first pride parade was held on 2 June 2018 in Georgetown. Hundreds of marchers called for the decriminalisation of homosexuality, and "the spread of love, not hate". Groups involved in the event included Caribbean Equality, the Guyana Rainbow Foundation, Guyana Trans United, and the Society Against Sexual Orientation Discrimination. No violent incident occurred, and the event received notable media coverage. The British High Commission flew a rainbow flag in support of the march. In the lead up to the event, a social media post of a father writing to his lesbian daughter condemning homophobia went viral. Global Voices said the "event allowed the country's LGBT community the opportunity to step out of the cloak of invisibility and claim their right to be proud of who they are and who they choose to love." The event was the first pride parade in the English-speaking Caribbean, and has inspired other countries to hold their own similar marches such as Barbados, Trinidad and Tobago and Saint Lucia.

The second pride festival was held between 28 May to 3 June 2019. On 1 June 2019, 200 people participated in the second pride parade that was held incident-free with police protection. However, there were some persons along the route who shouted insulting words at the participants. Among the participants was MP Priya Manickchand, who "recalled times when Guyana was intolerant of the community and stated how happy she was because Guyanese have finally become more accepting". She further compared the fight for LGBT rights to the fight for women's rights.

On 17 May 2019, the Empowering Queers Using Artistic Learning (EQUAL) organisation was launched. Its main objective is to empower LGBT persons using artistic learning or artistic education. "This empowerment will be accomplished especially by utilising the queer cultures that already exist in Guyana and molding them into positive contributions to society, so as to change the negative rhetoric that is constantly referenced in many sectors in Guyana."

In May 2019, managing director of the Society Against Sexual Orientation Discrimination (SASOD), Joel Simpson, said that over the years discriminatory laws have contributed to the extortion of LGBT people by law enforcement authorities. Several cases have been recorded where victims of anti-LGBT attacks were blackmailed by police officials who threatened to arrest them due to the country's law criminalising homosexuality. Simpson added that the number of hate crimes often go unreported. The organisation has also been working with health professionals to improve their knowledge of LGBT people and with the University of Guyana and nursing schools throughout the country.

In June 2019, Joel Simpson, managing director of SASOD, was the victim of an alleged homophobic attack. In what he categorised as a "hate crime", Simpson was attacked and beaten by six men early in the morning of 16 June as he was waiting to purchase food at Bourda Market, hours after being harassed by the same group at the Palm Court nightclub. He filed an official police complaint and called for hate crime legislation that covers sexual orientation and gender identity. The Ministry of Social Protection condemned the attack and said that members of the LGBT community should be accepted for who they are. One of the assailants turned himself in on 8 July 2019.

In July 2019, in a case that has been described as a usage of the gay panic defence, the Guyana Court of Appeal reduced Clive Knights' conviction for the murder of insurance company executive Bert Whyte in 2012, substituting instead a conviction of manslaughter and imposing a sentence of 30 years' imprisonment. Knights claimed that he fatally stabbed Whyte after Whyte had made "unwanted homosexual advances". The conviction was reduced from that of June 2015 after he had been sentenced to 57 years in jail after a jury found him guilty of the murder.

Demographics
According to a 2013 survey by the Caribbean Development Research Services Inc. (CADRES), roughly 8% of Guyanese society identified as LGBT, with about 2% identifying as gay, 1% as lesbian and 4% as bisexual. Another 15% answered that they did not want to state their sexual orientation. The same survey found that half of Guyanese people had a gay friend and a quarter had gay family members.

Public opinion
A 2013 study by CADRES found that about 24% of respondents "hate" homosexuals, while 38% were "tolerant" and 25% were "accepting." Broken down by religion, the study concluded evangelical Christians were the most opposed to homosexuality, with non-evangelical Christians were the most accepting. Hindus and Muslims were somewhere in between. A plurality of people in the survey stated that homosexuality was not an illness, but rather, a choice. Slightly more than half (53%) of Guyanese supported the criminalization of homosexual acts, but that more than half (52%) also stated they would be willing to change their minds if such laws "contributed to social and psychological problems" among the LGBT community. A 2013 CADRES study observed that 14% of Guyanese people supported legalizing same-sex marriage, while a 2010 Vanderbilt University study found that 7.5% of respondents supported same-sex marriage.

The 2017 AmericasBarometer showed that 21% of Guyanese supported same-sex marriage.

Religiosity 
In contrast to Western countries, LGBT people in Guyana tend to be more religious. According to a 2013 survey by the Caribbean Development Research Services Inc., 83% of LGBT Baháʼís, and 80% of LGBT Jews are actively involved in religious activities, followed by Hindus (69%), Baptists (62%), evangelical Christians (59%), Muslims (48%), and non-evangelical Christians (26%).

Summary table

See also
Politics of Guyana
LGBT rights in the Commonwealth of Nations
LGBT rights in the Americas
LGBT rights by country or territory

References